Florika Fink-Hooijer is a European civil servant at the European Commission. She leads the Directorate General for the Environment, which holds large responsibilities under the European Green Deal. 

She joined the European Commission in 1990 and has held various high level management posts in the area of external and security policy, humanitarian aid, disaster risk reduction and environmental protection.

Early life and education 
Fink-Hooijer was born in Darmstadt, Germany and grew up in Berlin. She studied law at the Rheinische Friedrich Wilhelms Universität Bonn, and the Université de Lausanne before completing a master's degree in International and Comparative Law at the Vrije Universiteit Brussel. 

She later earned a PhD in copyright at the Free University of Berlin with a dissertation on the subject of immediate termination in copyright contract law. 

Prior to joining the European Commission, she worked at the law firms such as Nordemann, Vinck & Hertin in Berlin, and De Brauw Blackstone Westbroek in The Hague.

European career 
Fink-Hooijer started her career as a European civil servant in the European Commission in 1990 where she first occupied positions as administrator in the internal market and the external policies department where she wrote extensively about EU policy. 

In 1995, she became a member of the Cabinet of Monika Wulf-Mathies, the Commissioner in charge of EU Regional Policy. Fink-Hooijer was tasked with the development of the pre-accession instruments as part of the Agenda 2000.

From 1999 onwards, she helped create the European Patent Convention alongside new approaches on copyright, e-commerce and data protection in the digital age as part of Commissioner Frits Bolkestein's cabinet responsible for Internal Market and Financial Services. 

Between 2000 and 2010, she took up various middle management positions, first in Directorate-General (DG) RELEX (the predecessor of the European External Action Service) and then in the Secretariat-General. In this period, Fink-Hooijer contributed to the creation of numerous EU civilian crisis missions and early EU military structures as well as negotiating and implementing for the European Commission the Kimberly Process Certification Scheme on conflict diamonds. She later became responsible for bilateral relations with South East Asia and the Monitoring and Certification Mechanism for Bulgaria and Romania.

In 2010, she headed the Cabinet of Vice-President Kristalina Georgieva during her term as International Cooperation, Humanitarian Aid and Crisis Response Commissioner helping create the European Emergency Response Coordination Centre and strengthen the EU Civil Protection Mechanisms.

In 2012, she became the first policy Director in the Directorate-General for European Civil Protection and Humanitarian Aid Operations working on the Ebola Crisis and Maritime Incident Response Groups. She substantially advanced the international role the EU plays in humanitarian aid and disaster risk reduction with the introduction of cash-based aid as well as gender and age sensitive aid. She also was instrumental in creating the European Voluntary Humanitarian Aid Corps to strengthen local capacity and resilience of disaster-affected communities. As a policy director for humanitarian aid, she further shaped the civil-military cooperation mechanism for the better protection of civilians in emergencies.

In 2016, she was appointed as Director General of DG Interpretation, the largest interpreting service in the world. Under her leadership, the first ever Knowledge Centre on Interpretation was created. She had spoken about the need to “futureproof” services by strengthening the skills of colleagues to work with new technologies.' as well as how Artificial Intelligence may be an (un)desired revolution in linguistic services. Subsequently, she drove forward the digitalization of the service by introducing features like automatic speech recognition and other support services to interpreters. During the COVID-19 pandemic, she scaled up multilingual interpretation in hybrid meetings via new digital platforms and technologies, which was a "watershed moment" for the interpretation profession.

In 2020, Fink-Hooijer became Director General of the Directorate General for Environment. She is responsible for implementing the European Green Deal focusing on Circular Economy, Biodiversity and Zero Pollution. On behalf of the European Union, she has attended various summits, including the international Biodiversity Summits.

Personal life 
She speaks German, English, Dutch and French fluently. She is married to fellow European Civil servant Johannes Jeroen Hooijer and has three children.

References 

1962 births
European civil servants
People from Darmstadt
Free University of Berlin alumni
University of Bonn alumni
University of Lausanne alumni
Vrije Universiteit Brussel alumni
Living people
20th-century German civil servants
German expatriates in Switzerland
German expatriates in Belgium
21st-century German civil servants